= Nickelodeon Director's Lab =

Movie-making interactive program

- Developer: Viacom New Media
- Publisher: Nickelodeon
- Release: 1994

Nickelodeon Director's Lab is a movie-making interactive program by Viacom New Media and published by Nickelodeon. A sequel was released called Nickelodeon Multimedia Lab.

== Reception ==
CNET said "Nickelodeon Director's Lab needs a good deal of conventional memory, which may not be available on your PC. But your kids won't be thinking of such technicalities when they're begging you to buy this program"
